Niccolò Bambini (1651–1736) was an Italian painter of the late-Renaissance and early-Baroque periods.

Biography

He was born in Venice in 1651, and first studied under Giulio Mazzoni at Venice. To this period belong the ceiling of the church of S. Moisè, in a poor state of preservation, and an Allegory of Venice in the hall of the Four Doors of the ducal Palace. Later went to Rome, where he became a pupil of Carlo Maratti. On his return to his homeland, seeing that the whole world was running after the paintings of Liberi, he also followed that beautiful way of painting.

An example of his imitations from Liberi is the allegorical ceiling of Ca 'Pesaro (1682). While The Nativity of the Virgin in the church of San Stefano, according to Zanetti, was "conducted following the style of the art school of Rome". However, this painting of porcelain colors and pungent design, however, represented an isolated case. Usually Roman memories are reduced in his paintings to some generic motifs typical of the Maratta's followers. Among his best works are The Adoration of the Magi in St.Zaccaria in Venice, painted in competition with A. Balestra, as well as the decoration of the library hall of the bishop's palace in Udine (1709). In his last period, he approached Sebastiano Ricci so much to be almost confused with him, as in the allegorical compartment with Minerva who Crowns Titus Livius in the ceiling of the library of the patriarchal seminary of Venice. For this reason it cannot be excluded that some works that considered of Ricci's youthful period belong to Nicolo Bambini, especially from the Parma group.

He died in Venice. He had two sons who were painters, Giovanni and Stefano.

Works
Works of Bambini that are found in Venice: 
 The Crowning of the Virgin, ceiling in the church of the Hermits;
 Deposition, in St. Marcuola;
 Immaculate, in St. Pantaleone;
 St. Joseph Appears to St. Teresa and The Consecrated Host Flies to St. Teresa, in the church of the Scalzi;
 Four Evangelists, in St. Spirit;
 Our Lady and Three Saints, in St. Stae;
 The Virtue that Drives Away Vices and The Time That Discovers the Truth, in the patriarchal palace;
 Agar in the Desert, at Palazzo Barbaro-Curtis;
 Stories of St. Romualdo, at the Museo Correr.

Sources

References

External links

1651 births
1736 deaths
Italian male painters
Painters from Venice
Italian Baroque painters
Pupils of Carlo Maratta
17th-century Venetian people
18th-century Venetian people